Jersey Girl is a 1992 American romantic comedy drama film directed by David Burton Morris.

Plot
Jersey Girl is the story of Toby, a lower-class girl who's a preschool teacher from New Jersey who's tired of feeling like her life has no purpose and nothing interesting in it.  While out to dinner with her friends, she decides she wants to change her fate.  After talking to her friends about what the ideal man is like, she decides she's going to go find him. Toby travels to New York and walks into a Mercedes-Benz dealership in search of her 'Mr. Right'.  She feels immediately uncomfortable and leaves.  While trying to back out of the parking lot, she nearly hits a man (Sal) driving a brand new MB.  He drives around her and leaves the parking lot, but she's smitten.  She follows him down the road, and ultimately ends up causing an accident resulting in significant damage to Sal's car.  They exchange information, and she decides to actively pursue him.

Cast
 Jami Gertz as Toby
 Dylan McDermott as Sal
 Sheryl Lee as Tara
 Aida Turturro as Angie
 Molly Price as Cookie
 Star Jasper as Dot
 Joseph Mazzello as Jason
 Joseph Bologna as Bennie
 Philip Casnoff as Mitchell
 Pat Collins as Gabe
 Regina Taylor as Rosie
 Amy Sakasitz as Monica
 Mary Beth Peil as Day Care Center Teacher
 Jordan Dean as Tim
 Richard Maldone as Bobby

References

External links
 
 

1992 films
American romantic comedy-drama films
Films set in New Jersey
1990s romantic comedy-drama films
1992 comedy films
1992 drama films
Films directed by David Burton Morris
1990s English-language films
1990s American films